is a Japanese business magnate. Satomi is known as the founder of Sammy Corporation, which merged with the Japan-based video game and arcade game producer Sega to form the holding company Sega Sammy Holdings.

History

Hajime Satomi withdrew from Aoyama Gakuin University November 1975 and founded Sammy Corporation. Sammy experienced significant growth when it began manufacturing machines for the pachislot and pachinko industry (one of Japan's most popular forms of gambling) and was successfully listed on the First Section of the Tokyo Stock Exchange in March 2001. Sammy Corporation is now the leading manufacturer of pachislot and pachinko machines.

With 22% shares bought in 2003, Sammy then bought a controlling share 1.1 billion dollars in Sega in 2004. Hajime Satomi heads the newly combined $4.5 billion (sales) group, now called Sega Sammy Holdings Inc. with its main businesses being those of Sammy Corporation and Sega Corporation.

Career highlights

At the Asia Business Leaders Award in 2005, The Sega Corporation named Satomi as the new chairman in a realignment of management, after the Sammy Corporation became Sega's biggest shareholder. Satomi, Sammy's president, succeeded Hisao Oguchi, who has now become vice chairman and chief creative officer of the new board. The announcement came two months after Sammy, bought 22.4 percent of Sega for 45.33 billion yen ($427 million), becoming the largest shareholder in the company.

Notes

References

External links
  — 2004-02-17
 https://www.forbes.com/lists/2006/10/0LNE.html
 http://spong.com/article/6201?cb=419
 http://globalbusinessleaders.org/WebPage/LeaderBio.aspx?leaderCd=l002&levelcd=c02r022
 https://web.archive.org/web/20070912191028/http://www.cnbcasia.com/abla2005/finalist6.shtm
 http://www.sega-16.com/forum/showthread.php?t=1901
 http://www.segasammy.co.jp/english/pr/corp/tpm.html

Articles
 Satomi appointed as Chairman of Sega

Interviews
Interview by Spiegel Online - 2006-10-12

1942 births
Living people
Businesspeople from Tokyo
Japanese chief executives
Japanese billionaires
Sega people
Japanese company founders
Japanese chairpersons of corporations
Japanese corporate directors
Japanese racehorse owners and breeders
20th-century Japanese businesspeople
21st-century Japanese businesspeople